is a Japanese web manga series written and illustrated by Taizan 5. It was published on Shueisha's web platform Shōnen Jump+ from December 2021 to March 2022, with its chapters collected in two tankōbon volumes.

Plot
Nnu-Anu-Kf is a Happian—an alien who resembles an octopus, who traveled from the Happy Planet in order to spread happiness to others. After crash-landing on Earth and escaping federal authorities, they come across Shizuka, a young middle school girl who is bullied relentlessly by her classmate Marina and only finds solace with her dog Chappy. Shizuka, noting that it resembles an octopus, names the alien Takopi. Takopi decides to use his planet's Happy Gadgets to help Shizuka, but after Marina intentionally gets bitten by Chappy in order for him to be taken in by animal control, Shizuka uses one of Takopi's gadgets to commit suicide. Realizing the gravity of the situation, Takopi uses another gadget to travel back in time, hoping that he can improve Shizuka's life.

Publication
Shueisha collected its sixteen chapters in two tankōbon volumes, released on March 4 and April 4, 2022.

Shueisha's Manga Plus service published chapters of the series in English simultaneously with their Japanese release. On February 3, 2023, Viz Media announced that they licensed the manga for English publication.

Volume list

Reception
Takopi's Original Sin won the Excellence Prize at the 51st Japan Cartoonists Association Awards in 2022. The series ranked third in the 2023 edition of Takarajimasha's Kono Manga ga Sugoi! list of best manga for male readers. The series ranked ninth on "The Best Manga 2023 Kono Manga wo Yome!" ranking by Freestyle magazine. It has been nominated for the 16th Manga Taishō in 2023, and for the 27th Tezuka Osamu Cultural Prize in the same year.

In February 2022, it was reported that the series surpassed the 2 million views per day on the Shōnen Jump+ platform. The first volume sold 41,277 copies in its first week, and the second volume sold 198,505 copies in its first week. By May 2022, the manga had over 1.2 million copies in circulation, including digital versions.

See also
 The Ichinose Family's Deadly Sins, another manga series by the same author

References

External links
  
 

2021 webcomic debuts
2022 webcomic endings
Japanese webcomics
Shōnen manga
Shueisha manga
Viz Media manga
Webcomics in print